Dino Paolo Restelli (September 23, 1924 – August 8, 2006) nicknamed "Dingo", was an American professional baseball player in 1944 and from 1946–1955 who appeared in Major League Baseball as an outfielder for the Pittsburgh Pirates in  and .

Born in St. Louis, Missouri to Italian immigrants, he grew up in San Francisco, California and attended Santa Clara University.  After World War II service in the United States Army, he became a baseball player with the San Francisco Seals of the Pacific Coast League, who traded him to the Pirates in June 1949.

Restelli achieved a measure of fame with the Pirates, when he hit a record seven home runs in his first ten games.   He finished his rookie season with 12 home runs in 72 games. Restelli is tied with Trevor Story and Trey Mancini for most home runs through a players first 12 career games.

After his baseball career, he became a San Francisco police officer.  He later settled in nearby San Carlos, California where he died at age 81 in 2006.

Footnotes

External links
 Statistics at Baseball Reference
 Obituary from SF Chronicle

1924 births
2006 deaths
American people of Italian descent
Baseball players from San Francisco
Channel Cities Oilers players
Hollywood Stars players
Indianapolis Indians players
Major League Baseball center fielders
Oklahoma City Indians players
Pittsburgh Pirates players
Portland Beavers players
Reno Silver Sox players
Sacramento Solons players
San Francisco Seals (baseball) players
Tulsa Oilers (baseball) players
United States Army personnel of World War II